In enzymology, a 2-hydroxy-6-oxo-6-phenylhexa-2,4-dienoate reductase is an enzyme that catalyzes the chemical reaction

2,6-dioxo-6-phenylhexanoate + NADP+  2-hydroxy-6-oxo-6-phenylhexa-2,4-dienoate + NADPH + H+

Thus, the two substrates of this enzyme are 2,6-dioxo-6-phenylhexanoate and NADP+, whereas its 3 products are 2-hydroxy-6-oxo-6-phenylhexa-2,4-dienoate, NADPH, and H+.

This enzyme belongs to the family of oxidoreductases, specifically those acting on the CH-CH group of donor with NAD+ or NADP+ as acceptor.  The systematic name of this enzyme class is 2,6-dioxo-6-phenylhexanoate:NADP+ Delta2-oxidoreductase. Other names in common use include 2-hydroxy-6-oxo-phenylhexa-2,4-dienoate (reduced nicotinamide, and adenine dinucleotide phosphate) reductase.

References

 

EC 1.3.1
NADPH-dependent enzymes
Enzymes of unknown structure